Ernest Brown (born November 10, 1989), professionally known as Charlie Heat, is an American record producer, songwriter and record executive. In 2015, he signed to Very Good Beats, a subsidiary of GOOD Music, which is run by Kanye West. Since making his debut into the mainstream music realm, Brown has worked with a wide array of artists such as Denzel Curry, Lil Uzi Vert, Tommy Genesis, Madonna, Ty Dolla Sign, Young Buck, Lecrae, Gucci Mane and  Travis Scott among others. Charlie Heat is the only producer featured on the track list for the Kanye West album The Life of Pablo.

Early life 
Brown was born in Woodbury, New Jersey on November 10, 1989. His mother and father worked as an immigration lawyer and a musician respectively. Early on in life, Brown was highly interested in basketball and music. Allen Iverson was a muse for the young boy According to Brown, his father highly influenced his musical interest, and while they attended a viewing of Drumline, Brown decided to solely focus on music. He attended Clark Atlanta University on a musical scholarship as a part of the drumline at HBCUs. It was here that he received the alias "The Human Torch", which would later transform into Charlie Heat.

Influences 
Michael Jackson, Earth, Wind & Fire, Selena and Rick James have been cited as influences, and inspired him through their musical works. There is a noticeable Latin sound in the works of Charlie Heat, as evident in the song "Undercover", and this influence is partly due to his interest in music from Mexican-American vocalist Selena, and Cuban vocalist, Celia Cruz, a notable Cuban singer. Charlie had piano instruction by his father at an early age, and this was a positive influence that has helped shape the talented producer into a great force in the recording industry.

Critical reception 
HotNewHipHop wrote of Heat's "impressive production discography", praising  “Facts (Charlie Heat Version)” from The Life of Pablo.

Danny Schwartz wrote about Heat's remix of Gucci Mane's song "Trap House" saying of it, "His remix of the song is the standout of his new 5-track EP of remixes, Till August."

Bryan Hahn wrote that "Charlie Heat is a name you’ll be seeing a lot more of in 2017." Hahn also wrote: "He’s been consistently delivering quality remixes." In a later article, Hahn wrote that, "Charlie Heat had a great 2016. And he’s not kicking back to rest on his laurels."

Christopher Harris, writing in HipHopDx, calls him "...an upstart beat-maker who has already worked on tracks for Madonna, Pusha T, Kanye and Vic Mensa."

James Elliott, writing for Complex, said that "Charlie Heat might not be on your radar yet, but he will be when this year is over."

Awards and nominations
Heat received three Grammy nominations for his work on The Life of Pablo.

Discography

Solo discography

Production discography

References

1989 births
Living people
American hip hop record producers
21st-century American composers
People from Woodbury, New Jersey